Erysichton is a genus of butterflies in the family Lycaenidae. The species of this genus are found in the Australasian realm.

Etymology
The genus is named after the mythological figure of Erysichthon of Thessaly.

Species
Erysichton lineata (Murray, 1874)

Former species
Erysichton albiplaga is now known as Jameela albiplaga (Tite, 1963)
Erysichton palmyra is now known as Jameela palmyra (Felder, 1860)

References

  1973: The higher classification of the Lycaenidae (Lepidoptera): a tentative arrangement. Bulletin of the British Museum (Natural History), entomology, 28: 371-505. BHL
 , 1916. Nacaduba Artengruppe Erysichton. Zool. Meded. 2: 137.
  2010: New Australian butterfly genus Jameela gen. nov. (Lepidoptera: Lycaenidae: Polyommatinae: Polyommatini) revealed by morphological, ecological and molecular data. Entomological Science 13 (1): 134-143. DOI: 10.1111/j.1479-8298.2010.00368.x. Abstract: .
  1992: A generic classification of the tribe Polyommatini of the Oriental and Australian regions (Lepidoptera, Lycaenidae, Polyommatinae). Bulletin of the University of Osaka Prefecture (B), 44(Suppl.)
 , 1999. The Butterflies of Papua New Guinea Academic Press, 
  1963: A synonymic list of the genus Nacaduba and allied genera (Lepidoptera, Lycaenidae). Bulletin of the British Museum (Natural History), entomology, 13(4): 67-116, plates 1,2.

Polyommatini
Lycaenidae genera